Under Ash (Arabic name: "Taht-al-ramad", تحت الرماد) is a first-person shooter sometimes explained to be a response to how Arabs are pictured in video games in general and America's Army in particular. Like America's Army, it is considered to be video game propaganda; however, it differs from America's Army in that it is not available free.

The player takes the role of Ahmed, a Palestinian opposed to Israeli occupation (Zionists). Through the course of the game, Ahmed progresses from throwing rocks at Israeli soldiers to destroying Israeli military positions. The game has been criticized for being too hard and is designed so that it is easy to be killed. If the player shoots a civilian, the game ends automatically. In the end, it is not possible to achieve victory. The game contains recreations of the Dome of The Rock mosque, the West Bank, and  Al Ramlah Prison an Israel Prison Service  facility.

The game was published by Afkar Media, a Syrian publishing company, and the first pressing of ten thousand copies sold out in a week. 

Its relevance to the fighting in the Middle East made it a controversial video game. The developers say it was made with a similar motive to  Delta Force and America's Army.

Under Ash was followed up with Under Siege.

See also
Special Force
Rendition: Guantanamo

References

External links
UnderAsh.net (in Arabic with some English)

The Developers website
University on Video game propaganda
 Interview with Radwan Kasmiya
 Digital Intifada, article about Afkar Media's games
 Digital Arabs: Representation in Video Games

2001 video games
First-person shooters
Windows games
Windows-only games
Advergames
Mass media about the Arab–Israeli conflict
Propaganda video games
Video games developed in Syria
Video games set in the State of Palestine
3D GameStudio games